Jimmy Connors was the defending champion but did not compete that year.

John McEnroe won in the final 6–1, 6–2, 6–4 against Johan Kriek.

Seeds
A champion seed is indicated in bold text while text in italics indicates the round in which that seed was eliminated.

  John McEnroe (champion)
  Roscoe Tanner (semifinals)

Draw

References
1981 World Championship Tennis Finals Draw

Singles